BET Presents Chris Brown is a DVD released by the American R&B singer-songwriter Chris Brown. The DVD was originally packaged with Exclusive, exclusively at Wal-mart. The release features BET highlights, performance highlights, and music videos from throughout Brown's career. Brown gives a candid interview as he talks about the production of Exclusive. The DVD also features BET highlights, performance highlights, and music videos from throughout Brown's career.

Release
In collaboration with Jive and Zomba Records, BET Official created BET Presents Chris Brown to help celebrate the release Brown's sophomore effort and gives his fans a chance to experience highlights from his career.
The DVD was originally packaged with Brown's second album, Exclusive, exclusively at Walmart. However, it is now available for individual purchase at online shopping sites such as Amazon.com.

DVD features	BET Highlights
2006 BET Hip Hop Awards Performances
Interview with Chris Brown
106 and Park Performances & Interviews

Music videos

"Run It!"
"Say Goodbye"
"Gimme That"
"Yo (Excuse Me Miss)"
"Wall to Wall"
"Kiss Kiss" (Sneak Peek)

External links
Brown BET Presents DVD OOP Features Music Videos, Live Performances, and More!

Chris Brown albums
2007 video albums
2007 compilation albums
Jive Records video albums
Music video compilation albums